From Hackensack to Englewood Cliffs is a compilation album by American saxophonist Ike Quebec, released in 2000 on Blue Note. The album compiles eight jukebox-oriented pieces recorded by Quebec for the label, which, coincidentally, was the last Blue Note session recorded at Rudy Van Gelder's original facility in Hackensack, New Jersey. The final two tracks were recorded at Van Gelder's new studio in nearby Englewood Cliffs.

The first eight tracks are also included in the later The Complete Blue Note 45 Sessions.

Track listing
All compositions by Ike Quebec, except where noted.

"A Light Reprieve" – 4:39
"The Buzzard Lope" – 6:17
"Blue Monday" (Fisher, Sharp, Singleton) – 5:05
"Zonky" (Edwin Swanston) – 4:34
"Later for the Rock" – 4:37
"Sweet and Lovely" (Arnheim, LeMare, Tobias) – 4:19
"Dear John" – 6:53
"Blue Friday" (Swanston) – 5:05
"Cry Me a River" (Hamilton) – 6:40 
"Uptight" – 5:04

Personnel
Ike Quebec – tenor saxophone
Edwin Swanston – organ
Clifton "Skeeter" Best – guitar
Charles "Sonny" Wellesley – bass
Les Jenkins – drums

References

2000 compilation albums
Albums produced by Alfred Lion
Albums recorded at Van Gelder Studio
Blue Note Records albums
Ike Quebec albums